Marchmont Herald of Arms is a current Scottish herald of arms of the Court of the Lord Lyon (there are six herald titles but only three heralds at any one time)

The office was first mentioned in 1438, and the title is derived from the royal castle of Marchmont, an older name for Roxburgh Castle in the Scottish Borders.

The badge of office is A tower of three castellations Vert masoned Argent, the dexter castellation Azure charged of a saltire Argent the sinister castellation Argent charged of a cross Gules, all ensigned of the Crown of Scotland Proper..

The office is currently held by The Hon. Adam Bruce, WS. He was appointed to this post on 2 April 2012.

Holders of the office

See also
Officer of Arms
Herald
Court of the Lord Lyon
Heraldry Society of Scotland

References

External links
The Court of the Lord Lyon



Court of the Lord Lyon
Offices of arms